Tërstenik is a village in the District of Pristina, Kosovo. It is located west of Pristina.

Notes and references

Notes

References

Villages in Drenas